Sean Hood (born August 13, 1966) is an American screenwriter and film director.

Early life
Hood graduated from Brown University, with a double major in pure mathematics and studio art, and then spent several years working in Hollywood as a set dresser, prop assistant and art director working with filmmakers as diverse as James Cameron, David Fincher and David Lynch. He continued his studies at the USC School of Cinematic Arts, graduating in 1997 with an MFA in production. His student short film, "The Shy and the Naked" won a grant from the Sloan Foundation for the positive portrayal of science.

Career

Screenwriting
Hood sold his first spec screenplay to MTV Films in 2000, and went on to sign a deal with Dimension Films, which included rewrites on Halloween: Resurrection and Cursed. He went on to work on Conan the Barbarian for producer Avi Lerner, and Hercules: The Legend Begins. Most recently, he penned an screenplay adaptation of the novel Rolling in The Deep, which will be produced by J. Todd Harris and directed by Mary Lambert (director). In 2011, Hood was hired to write the script for the fifth Rambo film, titled Rambo: Last Stand, however, Hood's script was put on hold in early 2012. In 2014, Hood's Rambo: Last Stand script was abandoned in favor of a new script by Sylvester Stallone.

Television
He wrote the episode Echoes for the NBC horror anthology series Fear Itself. Similarly, he contributed to the Showtime horror anthology series Masters of Horror by penning the episode Sick Girl.

Hood also worked on Sick for The CW. and The Dorm for MTV. In 2022, he adapted Warren Ellis' comic FreakAngels into an animated series for Crunchyroll.

Directing
He was one of the founding members of Filmmakers Alliance and often collaborates creatively with FA's president, Jacques Thelemaque. His most recent short film is Melancholy Baby.

Blogging
Hood wrote the screenwriting blog Genre Hacks from 2008 until 2017.

Teaching at USC
He is currently an adjunct professor at the USC School of Cinematic Arts. He teaches the courses "Writing the Feature Script" and "Advanced Motion Picture Script Analysis,"and "Creating The Short Film."

Credits

Film

Television

References

External links

Genre Hacks
Scripts & Scribes Interview with Sean Hood

1966 births
Living people
USC School of Cinematic Arts alumni
Brown University alumni
American television writers
American educators
American male screenwriters
American male television writers
Screenwriting instructors